Oritvision is a Venezuelan community television channel.  It was created in November 2004 and can be seen in the Cedeño Municipality of the Bolivar State of Venezuela on UHF channel 46.  Victor Moreno is the legal representative of the foundation that owns this channel.

Oritvision does not have a website.

See also
List of Venezuelan television channels

Television networks in Venezuela
Television stations in Venezuela
Television channels and stations established in 2004
Spanish language
Mass media in Venezuela
2004 establishments in Venezuela
Television in Venezuela
Spanish-language television stations